is a Japanese former professional baseball infielder, and current the second squad hitting coach for the Fukuoka SoftBank Hawks of Nippon Professional Baseball (NPB).

As a player he spent 16 years with the Osaka Kintetsu Buffaloes and 1 year with the Seibu Lions. He also managed the 06 Bulls, leading them to become champions of Hyogo in the Kansai independent league in 2015.

Career
Originally billed as a power hitting short-stop, Murakami played for the Osaka Kintetsu Buffaloes for the majority of his 17-year professional career. He was drafted out of high school by the Buffaloes at the 1983 NPB Draft in the first round.

He also has management experience working with the Osaka Golden Villicanes and the 06BULLS in the Baseball First League of the Kansai region where he led them to victory in the pennant race.

On 29 October 2018, Murakami was announced to be joining the coaching team of newly appointed Chunichi Dragons manager, Tsuyoshi Yoda, taking up a post as first-team hitting instructor. Following Yoda's resignation as manager, Murakami was confirmed as first team hitting instructor for the Fukuoka SoftBank Hawks under new manager Hiroshi Fujimoto for the 2022 NPB season.

He will serve as the second squad hitting coach starting in the 2023 season.

Personal
Murakami is an amateur golfer and has played alongside former Hanshin Tigers player and manager, Akinobu Mayumi.

References

External links

  Career statistics - NPB.jp 
 78 Takayuki Murakami PLAYERS2022 - Fukuoka SoftBank Hawks Official site

1965 births
Living people
Baseball people from Fukuoka Prefecture
Japanese baseball players
Nippon Professional Baseball outfielders
Kintetsu Buffaloes players
Osaka Kintetsu Buffaloes players
Seibu Lions players
Japanese baseball coaches
Nippon Professional Baseball coaches